Kévin Testud (born 12 April 1992) is a French professional footballer who plays as a winger for Annecy.

Career
Testud began playing football with his local side Saint Marcel, before moving to the youth academy of Bagnols Pont at the age of 13. He worked at the post office for 2–3 years, before becoming a semi-pro footballer with FC Sète. He had a short stint with Béziers, before returning to Sète, until returning again to Béziers in 2019. After a strong season there, he moved to FBBP01 in 2020. On 7 June 2021, he transferred to Annecy. He helped them come in 2nd in the 2021–22 Championnat National season and earned promotion into the Ligue 2. He made his professional debut with Annecy in a 2–1 Ligue 2 loss to Niort on 30 July 2022.

References

External links
 
 

1992 births
Living people
People from Montélimar
French footballers
FC Bagnols Pont players
FC Sète 34 players
AS Béziers (2007) players
Football Bourg-en-Bresse Péronnas 01 players
FC Annecy players
Ligue 2 players
Championnat National players
Championnat National 2 players
Association football wingers